Liuliqiao Subdistrict, formerly known as Lugouqiao Subdistrict, is one of the 14 subdistricts of Fengtai District, Beijing, China. It is situated on the north of Fengtai, south of Wangshoulu and Yangfangdian Townships, west of Taipingqiao Subdistrict, north of Fengtai Subdistrict, east of Babaoshan Subdistrict, and is contained by Lugouqiao Subdistrict (formerly Lugouqiao Township). Liuliqiao has a population of 223,304 as of the 2020 census.

The subdistrict was previously known as Lugouqiao, which was the native Chinese name of Marco Polo Bridge. On July 11, 2021, its name was changed to Liuliqiao, while the Lugouqiao Township was converted to Lugouqiao Subdistrict.

History

Administrative division 
As of 2021, Liuliqiao Subdistrict comprises 18 subdivisions, including 15 communities and 3 villages:

See also 

 List of township-level divisions of Beijing

References 

Fengtai District
Subdistricts of Beijing